Mone Wamowe (born 31 October 1986) is a New Caledonian footballer who plays as a forward for AS Lössi in the New Caledonia Super Ligue and the New Caledonia national football team. He made his debut for the national team on June 7, 2017 in a 2–2 draw against Fiji.

International career

International goals
Scores and results list New Caledonia's goal tally first.

References

Living people
1986 births
Association football forwards
New Caledonia international footballers
New Caledonian footballers
AS Lössi players